Author-level metrics are citation metrics that measure the bibliometric impact of individual authors, researchers, academics, and scholars. Many metrics have been developed that take into account varying numbers of factors (from only considering the total number of citations, to looking at their distribution across papers or journals using statistical or graph-theoretic principles). 

These quantitative comparisons between researchers are mostly done to distribute resources (such money and academic positions). However, there is still debate in the academic world about how effectively author-level metrics accomplish this objective.

Author-level metrics differ from journal-level metrics which attempt to measure the bibliometric impact of academic journals rather than individuals. However, metrics originally developed for academic journals can be reported at researcher level, such as the author-level eigenfactor and the author impact factor.

List of metrics

h-index
Formally, if f is the function that corresponds to the number of citations for each publication, we compute the h-index as follows. First, we order the values of f from the largest to the lowest value. Then, we look for the last position in which f is greater than or equal to the position (we call h this position). For example, if we have a researcher with 5 publications A, B, C, D, and E with 10, 8, 5, 4, and 3 citations, respectively, the h-index is equal to 4 because the 4th publication has 4 citations and the 5th has only 3. In contrast, if the same publications have 25, 8, 5, 3, and 3 citations, then the index is 3 because the fourth paper has only 3 citations.

Author-level Eigenfactor

Author-level Eigenfactor is a version of Eigenfactor for single authors. Eigenfactor regards authors as nodes in a network of citations. The score of an author according to this metric is his or her eigenvector centrality in the network.

Erdős number

It has been argued that "For an individual researcher, a measure such as Erdős number captures the structural properties of the network whereas the h-index captures the citation impact of the publications. One can be easily convinced that ranking in coauthorship networks should take into account both measures to generate a realistic and acceptable ranking." Several author ranking systems have been proposed already, for instance the Phys Author Rank Algorithm.

i-10-index

The i-10 index indicates the number of academic publications an author has written that have been cited by at least 10 sources. It was introduced in July 2011 by Google as part of their work on Google Scholar.

RG Score

ResearchGate Score or RG Score is an author-level metric introduced by ResearchGate in 2012. According to ResearchGate's CEO Dr. Ijad Madisch, “[t]he RG Score allows real-time feedback from the people who matter: the scientists themselves.” RG Score has been reported to be correlated with existing author-level metrics and has an undisclosed calculation methodology. Two studies reported that RG Score seems to incorporate the journal impact factors into the calculation. The RG Score was found to be negatively correlated with network centrality – users that are the most active on ResearchGate usually do not have high RG scores. It was also found to be strongly positively correlated with Quacquarelli Symonds university rankings at the institutional level, but only weakly with Elsevier SciVal rankings of individual authors. While it was found to be correlated with different university rankings, the correlation in between these rankings themselves was higher.

Field-weighted Citation Impact

Field-weighted Citation Impact (FWCI) is an author-level metric introduced and applied by Scopus SciVal. FWCI equals to the total citations actually received divided by the total citations that would be expected based on the average of the considered field. FWCI of 1 means that the output performs just as expected for the global average. More than 1 means that the author outperforms the average, and less than 1 means that the author underperforms. For instance,  means % more likely to be cited.

m-index

The m-index is defined as h/n, where h is the h-index and n is the number of years since the first published paper of the scientist; also called m-quotient.

Individual h-index

An individual h-index normalized by the number of authors has been proposed: , with  being the number of authors considered in the  papers.  It was found that the distribution of the h-index, although it depends on the field, can be normalized by a simple rescaling factor. For example, assuming as standard the hs for biology, the distribution of h for mathematics collapse with it if this h is multiplied by three, that is, a mathematician with h = 3 is equivalent to a biologist with h = 9. This method has not been readily adopted, perhaps because of its complexity. It might be simpler to divide citation counts by the number of authors before ordering the papers and obtaining the h-index, as originally suggested by Hirsch.

h2

Three additional metrics have been proposed: h2 lower, h2 center, and h2 upper, to give a more accurate representation of the distribution shape. The three h2 metrics measure the relative area within a scientist's citation distribution in the low impact area, h2 lower, the area captured by the h-index, h2 center, and the area from publications with the highest visibility, h2 upper. Scientists with high h2 upper percentages are perfectionists, whereas scientists with high h2 lower percentages are mass producers. As these metrics are percentages, they are intended to give a qualitative description to supplement the quantitative h-index.

g-index

For g-index is introduced in 2006 as largest number of top  articles, which have received together at least  citations.

e-index

The e-index, the square root of surplus citations for the h-set beyond h2, complements the h-index for ignored citations, and therefore is especially useful for highly cited scientists and for comparing those with the same h-index (iso-h-index group).

c-index

The c-index accounts not only for the citations but for the quality of the citations in terms of the collaboration distance between citing and cited authors. A scientist has c-index n if n of [his/her] N citations are from authors which are at collaboration distance at least n, and the other (N − n) citations are from authors which are at collaboration distance at most n.

o-index

The o-index corresponds to the geometric mean of the h-index and the most cited paper of a researcher.

Normalized h-index

The h-index has been shown to have a strong discipline bias. However, a simple normalization  by the average h of scholars in a discipline d is an effective way to mitigate this bias, obtaining a universal impact metric that allows comparison of scholars across different disciplines.

RA-index

The RA-index accommodates improving the sensitivity of the h-index on the number of highly cited papers and has many cited paper and uncited paper under the h-core. This improvement can enhance the measurement sensitivity of the h-index.

L-index

L-index combines the number of citations, the number of coauthors, the age of publications into a single value, which is independent of the number of publications and conveniently ranges from 0.0 to 9.9. With c as number of citations, a as number of authors and y as number of years, L-index is defined by the formula: 

 	
L-index is automatically calculated by the Exaly database.

s-index

An s-index, accounting for the non-entropic distribution of citations, has been proposed and it has been shown to be in a very good correlation with h.

w-index

w-index is defined as follow: if w of a researcher's papers have at least  citations each and the other papers have fewer than  citations, that researcher's w‐index is w.

Author Impact Factor

Author Impact Factor (AIF) is the Impact Factor applied to authors. Unlike the h-index, AIF is able to capture trends and variations of the impact of the scientific output of scientists over time,  which is a growing measure taking into account the whole career path.

Additional variations of h-index

There are a number of models proposed to incorporate the relative contribution of each author to a paper, for instance by accounting for the rank in the sequence of authors. A generalization of the h-index and some other indices that gives additional information about the shape of the author's citation function (heavy-tailed, flat/peaked, etc.) has been proposed.  Because the h-index was never meant to measure future publication success, recently, a group of researchers has investigated the features that are most predictive of future h-index. It is possible to try the predictions using an online tool. However, later work has shown that since h-index is a cumulative measure, it contains intrinsic auto-correlation that led to significant overestimation of its predictability. Thus, the true predictability of future h-index is much lower compared to what has been claimed before. The h-index can be timed to analyze its evolution during one's career, employing different time windows.

Criticism

Some academics, such as physicist Jorge E. Hirsch, have praised author-level metrics as a "useful yardstick with which to compare, in an unbiased way, different individuals competing for the same resource when an important evaluation criterion is scientific achievement." However, other members of the scientific community, and even Hirsch himself have criticized them as particularly susceptible to gaming the system.

Work in bibliometrics has demonstrated multiple techniques for the manipulation of popular author-level metrics. The most used metric h-index can be manipulated through self-citations, and even computer-generated nonsense documents can be used for that purpose, for example using SCIgen. Metrics can also be manipulated by coercive citation, a practice in which an editor of a journal forces authors to add spurious citations to their own articles before the journal will agree to publish it. 

Additionally, if the h-index is considered as a decision criterion for research funding agencies, the game-theoretic solution to this competition implies increasing the average length of coauthors' lists. 

Leo Szilard, the inventor of the nuclear chain reaction, also expressed criticism of the decision-making system for scientific funding in his book "The Voice of the Dolphins and Other Stories". Senator J. Lister Hill read excerpts of this criticism in a 1962 senate hearing on the slowing of government-funded cancer research. Szilard's work focuses on metrics slowing scientific progress, rather than on specific methods of gaming:
"As a matter of fact, I think it would be quite easy. You could set up a foundation, with an annual endowment of thirty million dollars. Research workers in need of funds could apply for grants, if they could mail out a convincing case. Have ten committees, each committee, each composed of twelve scientists, appointed to pass on these applications. Take the most active scientists out of the laboratory and make them members of these committees. And the very best men in the field should be appointed as chairman at salaries of fifty thousand dollars each. Also have about twenty prizes of one hundred thousand dollars each for the best scientific papers of the year. This is just about all you would have to do. Your lawyers could easily prepare a charter for the foundation. As a matter of fact, any of the National Science Foundation bills which were introduced in the Seventy-ninth and Eightieth Congress could perfectly well serve as a model."

"First of all, the best scientists would be removed from their laboratories and kept busy on committees passing on applications for funds. Secondly the scientific workers in need of funds would concentrate on problems which were considered promising and were pretty certain to lead to publishable results. For a few years there might be a great increase in scientific output; but by going after the obvious, pretty soon science would dry out. Science would become something like a parlor game. Somethings would be considered interesting, others not. There would be fashions. Those who followed the fashions would get grants. Those who wouldn’t would not, and pretty soon they would learn to follow the fashion, too."

See also
Academic age
Scientometrics

References

Further reading

Academic publishing
Citation metrics
Game theory
Cheating in science